Formed in 1866, the Peabody Orchestra, was the first professional orchestra in the city of Baltimore.  Based at the Peabody Conservatory, its leaders included Lucien Southard, Asger Hamerik and James Monroe Deems. The Orchestra premiered several influential works by Americans, as well as providing the first United States performance of several European pieces, especially from Hamerik's own Denmark. Among the Peabody Orchestra's players were flautist Sidney Lanier and pianist Harold Randoph.  The Orchestra disbanded in 1896.

References

1866 establishments in Maryland
1896 disestablishments in Maryland
Musical groups from Baltimore
Disbanded American orchestras
Musical groups established in 1866
Musical groups disestablished in 1896